Brian Flies (born 29 August 1969) is a Danish retired footballer, who played as a goalkeeper. Flies was a member of the Denmark U21 national team at the 1992 Olympic tournament, though he did not play any games. He became manager of Næstved BK in the summer of 2010. He resigned on 30 September 2011.

References

External links
 FCK profile

1969 births
Living people
Danish men's footballers
Association football goalkeepers
Næstved Boldklub players
F.C. Copenhagen players
Dundee United F.C. players
Lyngby Boldklub players
Akademisk Boldklub players
Danish Superliga players
Scottish Football League players
Danish expatriate men's footballers
Expatriate footballers in Scotland
Olympic footballers of Denmark
Footballers at the 1992 Summer Olympics
Danish football managers
Næstved Boldklub managers
BK Avarta players
People from Næstved Municipality
Sportspeople from Region Zealand